Peder Kjellberg (1 August 1902 – 12 October 1975) was a Norwegian boxer who competed in the 1920 Summer Olympics. In 1920 he was eliminated in the first round of the flyweight class after losing his fight to Joseph Charpentier.

References

External links
 list of Norwegian boxers

1902 births
1975 deaths
Flyweight boxers
Olympic boxers of Norway
Boxers at the 1920 Summer Olympics
Norwegian male boxers
20th-century Norwegian people